Maxx Force is a launched steel roller coaster at the Six Flags Great America amusement park in Gurnee, Illinois. It opened on July 4, 2019, and was manufactured by S&S - Sansei Technologies.

History

Development
On May 4, 2018, The Pictorium, a 980-seat IMAX theater that opened in 1979 as the "world's largest cinema experience", was closed and demolished with little publicity, almost one year away from its 40th anniversary. From August 2 through August 23, 2018, Six Flags Great America released four episodes of a teaser series titled "Road to Glory" on social media. In these episodes, a racer appropriately named "Maxx" races around the park as referees cheer him on. On August 30, 2018, Maxx Force was officially announced along with the rest of 2019 attraction announcements by Six Flags. Ride time is approximately 25 seconds.

Construction and operation
Shortly after Maxx Force's announcement on August 30, 2018, construction began in Carousel Plaza, forcing the nearby Whizzer to temporarily close and have a section of its track removed in order to place footers for the ride. In December 2018, track pieces had already arrived at the park. Maxx Force then went vertical on January 15, 2019 shown at the American Coaster Enthusiast (ACE) event that took place January 19, 2019. On May 13, 2019, the last piece of track was placed toward the end of the ride.

On June 12, 2019, one month after the last piece of track was completed, the Maxx Force coaster train made its first complete circuit after a few weaker launches to test the air launch mechanics. A commercial filming day was held on June 30. Media Day was on July 2, 2019 followed by a passholder preview the following day. The ride officially opened to the general public on July 4, 2019.

After the 2019 season, Six Flags worked in conjunction with a village-recommended sound engineer to review the noise level generated by Maxx Force. The launch system was so loud that it could be heard all throughout the park and surrounding areas of Gurnee. To reduce noise complaints, the company made modifications to the launch system, such as the addition of sound barriers.

For the 2022 season, the park added a single rider line for the attraction.

Ride experience

Seating 
Maxx Force features Formula One themed trains where riders are seated in 8 rows of 2 riders for a total of 16 riders per train. Each train has 4 total cars with two rows per car. Each seat is equipped with a lap bar and seatbelt. The lap bar also features shin guards and a pneumatic ratcheting system to lock. Each seat is constructed of fiberglass with a metal supporting frame, with a soft foam seat back and spine to protect the head and back during the immense speed of the launch.

Layout
After leaving the station, the train pulls forward into the launch area. The train sits in place while the catch wagon attaches to the front of the train before launching out of the area at a speed of 0 to 78 mph in just 1.8 seconds. The train launches under a low hanging bridge upon which the Great America Railway runs. It then goes into a "dog tongue" double inversion at 175 feet off the ground. As the train reaches the top it slows considerably, giving riders an excellent view of the park. The train exits the dog tongue and the riders experience a moment of weightlessness as the train begins its descent. The train then dives under the launch track while turning to the right. At this moment the riders experience the highest G-force of the ride at 4.5 Gs. The train enters a zero-g roll at 60 mph, the fastest inversion in the world. The train then enters a "Maxx Dive Loop", a double inversion above the station. This takes the riders through a semi-heartlined roll up and counterclockwise, as it suspends the riders 90 degrees to the right, before returning upside down and diving toward the ground. The train enters the brakes approximately halfway down the final inversion, then parks and returns to the station. The ride takes approximately 23 seconds from the initial launch to the final stop on the brakes.

Theme
Maxx Force's theme is based on racing. The train is based on the Formula One car, with similarly styled wheels on the front of the train, and one train colored red and one train colored black.  The ride's entrance re-uses the old Pictorium entrance, painted red and grey with the ride's logo on it. The gift shop nearby originally named Carousel Plaza Gifts that sold Great America apparel was transformed into Victory Lane which now sells Maxx Force items and Great America apparel.

World records
According to Six Flags, Maxx Force held these records on opening:

Fastest inversion in the world
Tallest double inversion in the world

Although Kingda Ka at Six Flags Great Adventure has North America's fastest launch speed, Maxx Force's launch has the fastest acceleration as Kingda Ka takes approximately 4 seconds to accelerate to its top speed while Maxx Force takes under 2 seconds to reach its top speed.

References

External links
Official website

Roller coasters manufactured by S&S – Sansei Technologies
Roller coasters operated by Six Flags
Roller coasters in Illinois